Arnold Bauman (July 24, 1914 – November 20, 1989) was a United States district judge of the United States District Court for the Southern District of New York.

Education and career

Born in New York City, New York, Arnold Bauman received a Bachelor of Business Administration degree from St. John's University in 1934, and a Juris Doctor from New York University School of Law in 1937. He was a prosecutor in the District Attorney's Office of New York County, New York from 1937 to 1941, and an assistant district attorney in that office from 1945 to 1947. In the interim, from 1941 to 1945, he was a United States Naval Reserve Lieutenant. He was engaged in the private practice from 1947 to 1953, then became head of the Criminal Division of the United States Attorney's Office for the Southern District of New York until he resigned in 1955 to enter private practice.

Federal judicial service

Bauman was nominated by President Richard Nixon on December 2, 1971, to the United States District Court for the Southern District of New York, to a new seat created by 84 Stat. 294. He was confirmed by the United States Senate on December 12, 1971, and received his commission on December 14, 1971. His service terminated on August 15, 1974, due to resignation. In resigning, he cited the insufficient pay, then $40,000 per year, allotted to federal district judges.

Post judicial service

Following his resignation, he returned to private practice, serving until his death on November 20, 1989, in New York City.

References

Sources
 
 NYT obituary

1914 births
1989 deaths
St. John's University (New York City) alumni
New York University School of Law alumni
Judges of the United States District Court for the Southern District of New York
United States district court judges appointed by Richard Nixon
20th-century American judges
20th-century American lawyers
Assistant United States Attorneys